The GLAAD Golden Gate Award is a special GLAAD Media Award presented annually by the Gay & Lesbian Alliance Against Defamation at the GLAAD Media Awards ceremony held in San Francisco. It is presented to individuals in media and entertainment who have increased the visibility and understanding of the LGBT community.

List of recipients
 2000 - Margaret Cho
 2002 - Brooke Shields
 2003 - Stockard Channing
 2004 - Megan Mullally
 2005 - Jennifer Beals
 2006 - Jennifer Tilly
 2008 - James Schamus
 2010 - Cybill Shepherd
 2011 - Kim Cattrall
 2012 - Shonda Rhimes

References

External links
 Official GLAAD Media Awards website

Golden Gate Award
Culture of San Francisco
Lists of LGBT-related award winners and nominees